Marfa Vasilevna Sobakina (1552–1571), was Tsaritsa of the Tsardom of Russia and was the third wife of Ivan the Terrible.

Life
The daughter of a Novgorod-based merchant, Vasiliy Sobakin, Marfa was selected by Ivan among twelve marriage finalists. A few days after her selection, Marfa began to succumb to a mysterious ailment. It was rumoured that she was unintentionally poisoned by her mother, who gave her a potion supposedly meant to increase her fertility. Despite rapidly losing weight and barely standing, Marfa was nonetheless married to Ivan on 28 October 1571 in Aleksandrovska Sloboda. Marfa died sixteen days later.

Her death increased her husband's paranoia, because she died in what was meant to be an impregnable fortress filled with loyal subjects. Ivan, remembering the death of his first wife, immediately suspected poison and put to death many of his subjects, including Mikail Temrjuk (brother to the Tsar's previous wife) who was impaled. Marfa was a cousin to Maluta Skuratov.

Legacy
The story of Marfa's selection and death is the base of the historical verse drama The Tsar's Bride by Lev Mei. The 
opera by the same name by Nikolai Rimsky-Korsakov is repertory opera in Russia.

References

 Troyat, Henri Ivan le Terrible. Flammarion, Paris, 1982
 de Madariaga, Isabel Ivan the Terrible. Giulio Einaudi editore, 2005

|-

|-

Wives of Ivan the Terrible
1552 births
1571 deaths
Burials at Ascension Convent
Deaths by poisoning